Strata is a 1981 science fiction comedy novel by Terry Pratchett. It is one of Pratchett's first novels and one of the few purely science fiction novels he wrote, along with The Dark Side of the Sun and The Nome Trilogy.

Although it takes place in a different fictional universe and is more science fiction than fantasy, it could be said to be a kind of precursor to the Discworld novels, as it also features a flat Earth similar to the Discworld. It has been called a "preconsideration" of Discworld, though the plot and characters are modelled on (or parodies of) the novel Ringworld by Larry Niven.

Plot summary
Kin Arad is a human planetary engineer working for “the Company”, a human organisation that manufactures habitable planets using techniques and equipment salvaged from an extinct alien race, the “Spindle Kings”, who excelled at terraforming.

The express purpose of the Company’s planet-manufacturing business is to create dispersed branches of humanity, diverse enough to ensure the whole species’ survival for eternity. The Earth’s population in the past has been decimated due to the lethal “Mindquakes”, epidemic mass deaths caused by too much homogeneity among the populace.

All planets built by the Company are carefully crafted with artificial strata containing synthetic fossils, indistinguishable from the real thing. On occasion, however, mischievous Company employees often attempt to place anomalous objects in the strata as practical jokes, like running shoes or other out-of-place artifacts, hoping to raise confusion among future archaeologists when the planets’ beginnings have been long forgotten. However the Company forbids this, and secretly monitors the generated strata in order to detect embedded jokes, fearing such actions may cause the collapse of entire civilizations when the artifacts are eventually unearthed.

Kin and two aliens are recruited by the mysterious Jago Jalo for an expedition. One alien is a paranoid, four-armed, frog-like, muscular “Kung” named Marco. The other alien is a bear-like “Shand”, historian and linguist named Silver. Jago Jalo is a human who returned from a relativistic journey he embarked on more than a thousand years ago, where he made a stunning discovery: A flat Earth.

When the team rendezvous with Jago Jalo on the Kung homeworld, the violent Jalo unexpectedly has a heart attack and dies. Kin Arad is shocked by the large store of weapons on-board Jalo's spaceship, and has misgivings about the expedition; Silver and Marco, however, see the possibility of reaping great technological rewards and launch the vessel on autopilot.

When the expedition arrives at Jalo’s pre-programmed coordinates, they find a flattened version of the medieval Eastern hemisphere of the Earth they had originally departed from, before their disturbing rendezvous with Jalo. Clearly artificial, the disc rotates around its hub, and is contained inside a gigantic hollow sphere with tiny artificial “stars” affixed to the interior, augmented with a small meandering artificial sun, moon, and fake planets revolving around it.

Their ship is hit by one of the “planets” wandering on the interior of the sphere, so Kin, Marco, and Silver are forced to abandon ship. They land on the flat planet with the help of their “lift-belt” equipped suits, while their ship crashes. A return from the flat world now seems impossible, but hoping for assistance from the disc’s mysterious builders, Kin, Marco, and Silver set off towards a structure they had spotted at the disc’s hub. It is the only thing on the flat “Earth” which does not match the geography of the spherical Earth they left.

En route, the team encounter the superstitious Medieval inhabitants of the disc, who believe the end of the world is near, due to increasingly chaotic climate (caused by the disc’s machinery breaking down), the recent disappearance of one of their planets, and the general devastation caused by the ship's crash. The three travelers also discover a number of other differences.

What Kin Arad knows as “Reme” is called “Rome” on the disc, and there is a strange “Christos cult” that is completely unfamiliar to Kin. Also, Venus is conspicuously lacking its giant (lunar-sized) moon “Adonis”, which dominates the sunset sky on the Earth Kin Arad came from, which was formative in leading humanity to an early heliocentric world view.

Since only the Eastern hemisphere of Earth is represented, the continent of America is completely missing, so Kin, Marco, and Silver rescue a party of Vikings in the process of searching for Vinland, when their ship is about to sail over the edge of the world.

The flat world is apparently an extremely old and sophisticated automated system. In addition, there are real magical creatures and objects on the disc – Demons, and magic purses, and flying carpets – all of which, the travelers deduce, are themselves highly advanced, sophisticated technological constructs, just like the disc.

The travelers eventually reach the structure at the hub and make contact with the disc’s automated control-systems. They are told that (aside from the recent damage) the sheer build-up of entropy in the old machinery has exceeded the capacity of its advanced robotic maintenance. Catastrophic failure threatens the disc’s further existence. The machines offer to exchange their advanced technology for the construction of a real (spherical) planet as a refuge for the disc “Earth” inhabitants. Kin, the planetary engineer, agrees. She is excited about the massive task at hand; just like the parallel character Louis Wu  in Ringworld, Kin is over two hundred years old, and in danger of becoming tired of life.

The implication of the denouement is that the conventional planet Kin Arad will build is in fact the readers’ own “Earth”.
By the end of the story, Kin comes to the further suspicion that the builders of the flat world constructed the whole universe. The evidence of previous races would then be hoaxes, and the flat world itself would be a prank by the universe’s construction crew – analogous to the artificial strata Kin and the Company manufacture, and the occasional prankster employees inserting hoaxes in the artificial strata.

Interpretation
The history of the protagonists' home-planet "Earth" in Strata unfolded very differently from the readers' Earth:
 North America is named Valhalla, and was colonised in the first millennium A.D. by Vikings, led by Leif Ericson;
 the Roman Empire is known as Reme instead, after the other twin in the story of Romulus and Remus;
 the planet Venus is orbited by a moon like Earth's Luna
 none of the Abrahamic religions ever developed in its history (a mixture of Buddhism and folk religion seems to have predominated, punctuated by an assortment of flash-in-the-pan religious cults)
 humans are much more developed in the field of space travel and have met several other intelligent species, such as the tall, frog-like Kungs, and the bear-like Shandi

The book implies that the reason for the historical discrepancies is that the readers' "Earth" is actually the replacement world created by Kin Arad for the inhabitants of the malfunctioning disc "Earth", to which the protagonists of the book travel early in the story. While the history and features of the flat "Earth" in Strata clearly is not the one we are familiar with, the history of the flat Earth is consistent with our own, up to the point where the expedition arrives.

Humanity appears to be merely the latest of a long series of intelligent species who have evolved, altered the universe to better suit themselves, and then died out before the next species arose and started the cycle all over again. Before humans, there were the Great Spindle Kings, a race of acutely claustrophobic telepaths, who could live only a few hundred per planet and therefore built entire worlds from scratch to accommodate their population. Before them were the Wheelers, who were themselves preceded by increasingly alien races extending all the way back to the Big Bang.

Interestingly, all of what is known about the intelligent species who have lived before humans is revealed to be incorrect near the end of the book, when the Disc's computer system (built by the universe's actual creators) reveals to Kin that the entire universe is only 70,000 years old and that evidence and remains of long dead civilizations were fabricated by the universe's creators to make the universe appear older than it is (much like the Company-fabricated prehistoric fossils on their created worlds to make them appear older than they really were). Finally, the fact that the computer systems on the disc "Earth" need humans, implies that the universe was itself created by humans as a place for themselves to live.

Translations
 Страта (Bulgarian)
 Strata (Czech)
 Delven (Dutch) (published together with The Dark Side of the Sun in one volume in 1982: republished separately as Strata in 1994)
 Strate-à-gemmes (French)
 Strata (German)
 Dysk (Polish) (first edition was entitled "Warstwy Wszechświata", Polish for "Layers of the Universe"; "Strata" means "loss" in Polish)
 Страта (Russian)

References

External links
 Annotations for Strata
 Quotations from Strata

1981 British novels
1981 science fiction novels
British science fiction novels
Comic science fiction novels
Novels by Terry Pratchett
Xenoarchaeology in fiction